The 2023 Archery World Cup, also known as the Hyundai Archery World Cup for sponsorship reasons, is the 17th edition of the international archery circuit organised annually by World Archery. The 2023 World Cup consist of four events, and will run from 19 April to 10 September so far.

Calendar
The calendar for the 2022 World Cup, announced by World Archery.

Results

Recurve

Men's individual

Women's individual

Men's team

Women's team

Mixed team

Compound

Men's individual

Women's individual

Men's team

Women's team

Mixed team

References

External links
 World Archery website

Archery World Cup
World Cup
International archery competitions hosted by Turkey
International archery competitions hosted by China
International archery competitions hosted by Colombia
International archery competitions hosted by France
International archery competitions hosted by Mexico